The Jinfo Mountain salamander (Pseudohynobius jinfo) is a species of salamander in the family Hynobiidae endemic to China, known only from Nanchuan District in Chongqing (formerly Sichuan). Its type locality is a spring-fed pond on Mount Jinfo. P. jinfo specimens from Nanchuan were first assumed to be yellow-spotted salamanders (P. flavomaculatus), but genetic methods, and later on, discovery of adult salamanders, allowed them to be identified as a new species.

References

Further reading
AmphibiaWeb: Information on amphibian biology and conservation. 2008. Berkeley, California: Pseudohynobius jinfo. AmphibiaWeb.

Pseudohynobius
Amphibians of China
Endemic fauna of China
Amphibians described in 2009